Valery Fydorovich Spiridonov (born in 1957) is a former pair skater who competed for the Soviet Union. With Inna Volyanskaya, he won six international medals, including gold at the 1982 Nebelhorn Trophy.

Career 

Early in his career, Spiridonov skated with Zoya Akinfieva. By 1979, he was competing with Inna Volyanskaya.

Volyanskaya/Spiridonov won silver at the 1980 St. Ivel International, gold at the 1980 Blue Swords, silver at the 1981 Prague Skate, gold at the 1982 Grand Prix International St. Gervais, and gold at the 1982 Nebelhorn Trophy. After retiring from competition, they skated together in ice shows, including Torvill & Dean ,and the Russian Allstars.

Spiridonov coaches in Moscow.

Personal life 
Spiridonov was born in 1957. He was formerly married to Volyanskaya. He later married Soviet ice dancer Elena Garanina. Their son, Anton Spiridonov (born 5 August 1998, United States), has competed in ice dancing for Russia, the United Kingdom, and the United States.

Competitive highlights 
with Volyanskaya

References 

1957 births
Soviet male pair skaters
Living people